Ham Pong-sil (born 24 July 1974) is a North Korean long-distance runner who specializes in the marathon race.

She is a three-time Pyongyang Marathon winner (2002, 2003, 2005).

After the Paris World Championships in 2003, she was appointed to a post in charge of track and field coaching in North Korea. She trained O Song Mi, among others.

Achievements

Personal bests
5000 metres - 15:37.5 min (2002) - national record.
10,000 metres - 34:35.30 min (2005)
Half marathon - 1:12:47 hrs (2003)
Marathon - 2:25:31 hrs (2003) - national record.

References

External links

1974 births
Living people
North Korean female long-distance runners
Athletes (track and field) at the 2000 Summer Olympics
Athletes (track and field) at the 2004 Summer Olympics
Olympic athletes of North Korea
Asian Games medalists in athletics (track and field)
Athletes (track and field) at the 2002 Asian Games
North Korean female marathon runners
Universiade medalists in athletics (track and field)
Asian Games gold medalists for North Korea
Medalists at the 2002 Asian Games
Universiade gold medalists for North Korea
Medalists at the 2001 Summer Universiade
20th-century North Korean women
21st-century North Korean women